This is a list of characters from the Monica's Gang franchise, created by Brazilian cartoonist Maurício de Sousa. Note that only characters from the main series are detailed here. For characters from related publications, check the navigation box at the bottom of this page.

De Sousa's initial characters were all male. He was once called a "misogynist" for this, which led him to create his first female characters, inspired by some of his own daughters.

Main characters 

The four main characters of Monica's Gang are:

 Monica (Mônica)

 Jimmy Five (Cebolinha "Chives")

 Smudge (Cascão)

 Maggy (Magali)

Minor characters

Franklin 
Franklin (Franjinha,  Little Fringe) The child prodigy of the gang, being a preteen. He is a scientist who creates formulas, time machines and several fantastic devices in his laboratory that often fall into the hands of their friends creating serious problems. Many times Jimmy Five takes advantage of using his inventions to use them to defeat Monica, sometimes convincing Franklin to help him in his plans to dominate the street. He owns of the puppy Blu, who has been his best friend since the first comic strips. Usually seen walking along with Bucky, Jeremiah, and Manezinho, which has been his friends since the earliest comics. He also has a secret love for Marina, often using their inventions to try to impress her. He is blond with a black bangs covering his forehead, usually wears black shorts, brown shoes, and a red shirt with a button (very similar to Jimmy Five's clothes), and occasionally also a white coat when in his laboratory. The character was originally based on Mauricio de Sousa himself as a child.

Bucky 
Bucky (Titi) is Franklin's best friend and one of the older boys in the gang. He is an arrogant, narcissistic and flirtatious boy. Bucky has teeth as big as Monica, but his friends hardly make fun of that. Bucky dates Annie, but constantly betrays her hidden and hangs around with any girls he sees. He sometimes ends up alone and hated by his ex-girlfriends, because he dates so many girls that it becomes impossible for him to hide one from the others. Usually he is seen together Franklin, Jeremiah and Manezinho in most of the stories, sometimes forming the team of the older preteen boys known as the "Turma do Bermudão" (lit. Big Shorts' Gang).

Jeremiah 
Jeremiah (Jeremias) is another of Franklin's best friends, and one of Mauricio's few Afro-Brazilian characters. He is seen most of the time hanging out with Fraklin, Bucky (who is his best friend) and Manezinho. He often wears a red cap (which belonged to his grandfather), hiding that he is bald. At first, until the early 70s he was drawn in a strong black color with blackface features, but nowadays, his color is a softer brown and has thin lips.

In 2018, the character became the protagonist of a graphic novel from the Graphic MSP collection, entitled Jeremias: Pele, addressing issues of racial prejudice. The graphic novel was written by Rafael Calça and drawn by Jefferson Costa, having had a sequel in 2020 entitled Jeremias: Alma.

Manezinho 
Manezinho is another of Franklin and Bucky's best friends. He is an immigrant from Portugal who now lives in Brazil. He is often seen wearing red overalls and has hair similar to Monica's. He was frequently present in the comics until the early 70s, only returning in the 2000s with an excuse that in the meantime he was living in Portugal and returned to Brazil again. In the current comics it is revealed that he has a young brother called António Alfacinha.

Hummer 
Hummer (Humberto) is a boy suffers from muteness, which means all he can do to communicate is to murmur "hmm-hmm". In some strips, it is stated that he is also deaf, and that he reads people's lips to understand what they are saying. Originally he was introduced in 1960 as a pre-teen being one of Franklin's friends, but over time he was redesigned as a boy the same age as Jimmy Five.

Mary Angela 
Mary Angela (Maria Cebolinha) is Jimmy Five's baby sister. She is a baby who is between 1 and 2 years old, sometimes being able to speak a few words. Just like Monica and Maggy she was also based on one of Mauricio de Sousa's first daughters, Mariângela, being the eldest daughter of the family.

Specs 
Specs (Zé Luís) is one of the oldest kids of the gang. Specs likes reading and studying, but also finds time to hang with his friends. He was introduced as one of the Jimmy Five's best friends and sidekick during the return of the strips in the newspapers in 1963, at first without personality. When Monica first appeared, she was said to be his little sister, but the idea was discarded in later strips. Specs was also originally the leader of the boys' club, but this idea was also forgotten giving his place to the Jimmy Five. Currently he has rarely appeared in modern comics, usually in favor of Franklin who is the main genius of the gang. His age is inconsistent, typically being portrayed between a pre-teen or teenager (mostly in recent comics) or even as a tall kid in the same age of Franklin. In Monica Teen he along with Crystal first appeared working for Bubbly in his spaceship, occupying the rank of Ensign.

Couch Gag Louie 
Couch Gag Louie (Teveluisão, a portmanteau of the Portuguese words "Televisão" (Television), "Luís", and "Luisão" (Big Luís)) is a boy that as his name suggests, he is addicted to television, and spends all day watching it. He is one of the older boys being the same age as Specs (who is sometimes seen as his best friend). His friends always tells him that this is not healthy, and forces him to go outdoors. His main feature is that in addition to his glasses he is often seen with a grin even when he is speaking, being rarely seen without the grin. He is Bloggy's older brother. Like Specs he used to be a regular character between the 60's and 70's, but has few appearances in current comics.

Sunny 
Sunny (Xaveco) is Jimmy Five and Smudge's best friend. The main characteristic of this boy a lack of any defining features. He is always referred to as "the secondary character", and the main characters always make fun of his apparent uselessness. He constantly attempts to elevate his rank to that of a main character, a trait which he transfers to his teen version in the spinoff series Monica Teen.

Sunny originally appeared in the 1960s comic strips as one of several Jimmy Five's friends with whom he starred, and continued to appear in the comic books usually serving as a supporting character in most of the stories without showing any personality. Starting in the 2000s he began to have more prominence in stories written by Emerson Abreu, which helped to develop his current trait of "secondary character", as well as his family starting with his older sister Xabéu and his divorced parents. In recent stories he is seen spending time with his clumsy father whom he visits often as he lives with his mother and sister. Also in more recent stories he is seen having a paternal grandmother named Xepa and a yellow poodle named Ximbuca.

Angel 
Angel (Anjinho, lit. Little Angel) – As the name suggests, he is the guardian angel of Monica's Gang. He lives in the clouds high up above (presumably heaven). Acting more like a superhero, he is constantly called to help children under his guard, including Monica and all her friends. He also works like an advice-giver to the gang. It is impossible for him to protect all the kids from the scrapes they get into, and he most likely becomes involved in the chaos. His recurring gag is the many different ways that the gang will use to call him down (most usually Monica), often getting Angel injured or scared.

Annie 
Annie (Aninha, lit. Little Ana) is Bucky's (main) girlfriend. She discovers his many betrayals, but in the end, she forgives her unfaithful boyfriend. She is very jealous of him, but Bucky still manages to date other girls while Annie's not watching over him. Later, on the series sequel, Monica Teen, Annie finally gets over Bucky, leaving him desperate to reconsiliate the relationship.

Dustine 
Dustine (Maria Cascuda) is Smudge's girlfriend. Originally in the early stories Dustine was just as dirty girl, easily being a female counterpart of Smudge as her Portuguese name suggests, but over the years she has gradually changed her personality into a clean girl who takes frequent showers (although occasionally she is still drawn with smudges on her cheeks just like her boyfriend), what is occasionally portrayed as a running gag, as Smudge still prefers dirt. In the recent comics is a great friend to Monica and Maggy. She sometimes shows difficulties with her relationship with Smudge, both because Smudge doesn't take dating seriously and is often feel jealous to see her boyfriend with other girls, very similar to the relationship between Bucky and Annie. Her real name is Maria Cassandra, but she is usually referred to by the nickname Cascuda (Dustine in the English translations).

Toddy 
Toddy (Quinzinho, lit. Little Quim (a short for Joaquim)) is Maggy's boyfriend being also the humble son of a baker. He is an overweight boy of Portuguese descent and often helps his father in his work, baking and delivering bread. He was originally introduced in the early issues of Maggy's comic book as a love interest for her, but over time became her boyfriend. Although he and Maggy show that they love each other very much, Maggy is usually shown to like him mostly due to his ability to satisfy her need for fresh baked goods.

Denise 
Denise is a gossipy friend of Monica and Maggy, but sometimes acting as a rival to them when being with Cindy. Like Sunny, before she was a minor character but with an inconsistent design that often changes every story, until be revealed in a story that the character was played by several girls. Currently, she has appeared in stories with a fixed look having brown hair with pigtails and a purple dress. Originally in the first appearances during the 1990s she had no personality, and is often used as a support character for Monica and Maggy in stories focused only in the girls, or sometimes serving as an accomplice to Cindy practicing bullying against Monica. In recent stories after having her official look she has appeared more frequently in stories often being characterized by her outgoing, outspoken and self-centered, but charismatic, personality, sometimes acting more mature than the other kid characters.

Junior 
Junior (Dudu) is the younger cousin of Maggy. A spoiled, troublemaker and a selfish 5-year-old boy who loves to tease the boys of the neighborhood, mainly Jimmy Five. He tends to be the opposite of Maggy, while his cousin is a glutton and has a voracious appetite Junior hates eating all kinds of food. He proves to be very intelligent for his age.

Nimbus 
Nimbus is Nick Nope's brother and the magician of the gang. Like Marina and Nick Nope, he was also based on one of Mauricio's sons (Mauro Takeda e Sousa), Originally when was introduced in 1994, he was very interested in meteorology, being afraid of thunders and storms, having these characteristics based on the real Mauricio's son who was also interested in climatology in the childhood. He also appeared as Smudge's friend for sharing fear of rain clouds, but not water. However some years later Mauricio decided to change his characteristic later when the real Mauro Souza stopped to have interest by meteorology, at first becoming a boy beloved by the girls, but later as a magician in 1999.

Nick Nope 
Nick Nope (Do Contra) is a boy that as his Portuguese name implies ("do contra" can be translated as "against", "contrary"), he likes to avoid the mainstream and do everything in reverse to the normal way. His running gag is liking for strange foods, like salty ice creams or rice with chunks of watermelon. He is Nimbus' brother. Like Marina, he is based on one of Mauricio's children (Mauricio Takeda e Souza).

Marina 
Marina, first introduced in 1994, she was based on one of Mauricio's daughters, Marina Takeda e Sousa. Both Marinas love painting and drawing. Sometimes she has a giant magic pencil capable of giving life to any drawing she does, as well as redesign objects and sometimes characters, also possessing an eraser capable of erasing anything. Marina caught Franklin's eye, and became the subject of his unrequited affection (although she does date him in the spinoff series Monica Teen).

Cindy Frou-frou 
Cindy Frou-frou (Carminha Frufru) is an arrogant rich girl and Monica's main rival. Among boys, she is considered the most popular girl in the neighborhood, and often the target of jealousy from other girls. She often hangs out with Denise to try to humiliate Monica and her friends. Similar to what happens to her also occurs to Fabio, the most popular boy among the girls.

Tony from Down the Street 
Tony from Down the Street (Tonhão da Rua de Baixo) is a fat and brute bully boy who often bullies the boys from the Lemon Street. Picky, grumpy and often thick stands behind the boys, but always lose a fight to Monica. He lives on a street below the Lemon Street, and has a counterpart of the same name who lives up the street. He is often seen wearing a yellow whoopee cap (very similar to a crown) and is bald. He also appears in the spin-off Monica Teen as one of the antagonists, rival of Jimmy Five, having a gigantic change in his look, becoming thin and having long blonde hair.

Crystal 
Crystal (Xabéu Lorota) - Sunny's teenage older sister, portrayed as an active and jolly teen girl. Being the oldest and attractive girl in the Lemon Street she is often passion target of every boy, mainly Jimmy Five and Smudge. Usually is seen working as a nanny in the neighborhood, mainly for Junior.

Bloggy 
Bloggy (Bloguinho, lit. Little Blog) is a computer-obsessed young boy. His speech balloons are written with internet slangs and emoticons. Lately, he also began to express himself through meme faces. He was introduced as Teveluisão's little brother, who is a television-loving adolescent (see below). In addition, his hair is a simple "@".

Doreen 
 Doreen (Dorinha, lit. Little Dora) introduced in 2004, she is a blind girl inspired by blind philanthropist Dorina Nowill. As she is blind since birth, she doesn't know the shape of things, so she often just imagines. Her remaining senses are very precise, though.

Luca 
Luca is  a paralytic boy, who is one of the boys who is the target of Monica's affections. It was introduced in 2004 together with Doreen. He is very active, though. He plays basketball, and performs tricks on his chair, just like a skateboarder. His chair is also equipped with several gadgets set by Franklin. The girls find him a very cute boy, especially Monica. In the first appearances he was nicknamed as "Da Roda" (of the wheel, due to his wheel chair), however over time the nickname was forgotten.

Marcelinho 
Marcelinho (lit. Little Marcelo) Inspired by Maurício's youngest child, Marcelo Pereira de Sousa was created in 2015 and is described as a "7-8-year-old boy who likes to do everything the right way, don't like wasting resources and knows how to save money".

Milena 
Milena is another of Monica and Maggy's friends. An Afro-Brazilian girl who was created in 2017 for marketing, however was introduced in the comics in 2019.

Parents and Adults

Mr. Sousa and Ms. Luisa 
Monica's parents. Sousa is based on Mauricio de Sousa himself, although he is a separate character from him.

Mr. Five and Ms. Five 
Known as Seu Cebola and Dona Cebola (lit. Mr. Onion and Ms. Onion) in the original, they are Jimmy Five and Mary Angela's parents. Mr. Five shares strong similarities with his son having the same five-strand hair, like his son he is clumsy and has no good luck and works in an office. Ms. Five (which real name is Maria) is a fat woman and works as a housewife.

Mr. Antenor and Ms. Lurdinha 
Smudge's parents. Their full names are Antenor Araújo and Lurdes Marques. Similar to Mr. Five, Antenor is also a clumsy father and shares strong similarities with his son having the same hair and also works in an office. Lurdinha is known for being a housewife often seen cleaning the house and arguing with her son about the messes he makes and for often disobeying her about her obsession with dirt and not wanting to shower. Originally when they were introduced they were dirty like their son, however over time they were characterized as being clean.

Mr. Carlito and Ms. Lina 
Maggy's parents. Their full names are Carlos Paulo (for a few moments he is also referred to as Mr. Paulinho) and Eliana Fernandes (sometimes being nicknamed as Ms. Lili). Carlito often works in an office to support his family, especially his daughter's immense hunger. He sometimes acts as an antagonist to Vanilla wanting to kick him out due to his allergy to cats. He is also the brother of Ms. Cecília, which makes him Junior's uncle. Ms. Lina is Maggy's mom shares some facial similarities with her daughter, usually is seen cooking and is the niece of Aunt Nena.

Mr. Durval and Ms. Cecília 
Junior's parents. They are often seen having to put up with their child's picky eater behavior. Cecília is Carlito's sister, which makes her Maggy's aunt.

Mr. Xavier and Ms. Xarlene 
Xaveco and Xabéu's parents who are divorced. Similar to Xabéu, they were initially introduced as unnamed characters in the stories written by Emerson Abreu, but over time they gained more prominence. Xaveco and Xabéu live with Xarlene, in a large house with a swimming pool, but Xaveco is often seen visiting his father to have moments between father and son. Similar to Mr. Five and Mr. Antenor, Xavier is characterized both by having a clumsy father and also by sharing facial similarities with his son (notably his hair). Xavier is also Ms. Xepa's son. A characteristic involving the stories between Xaveco and Xavier is that they are mostly mute and Xaveco is often seen having accidents due to his father's clumsy way who often kisses him in every accident.

Nutty Ned 
Nutty Ned (Louco, lit. Crazy (Man)) is a completely nonsense and unreasonable character. Apparently, lives in a hospice nearby to Jimmy Five's house. Often disturbs the boy with surreal adventures that lead him to madness.

Mr. Bill 
Mr. Bill (Seu Juca) is a running gag, this character appears doing a different job every strip. He changes jobs so frequently because Monica and her friends always try to "help" him with his work. Bill's attempts to stop them invariably result in disaster, and Bill's loss of his job

Aunt Nena 
Aunt Nena - Maggy's baker aunt. She is known for being a great and famous chef, being expert in making numerous cakes and sweets that often end up being devoured by her niece. Sometimes she also helps Maggy with some advice. In some stories it is also revealed that she is a witch, having learned some spells through some books.

Uncle Pepo 
Uncle Pepo - Maggy's toymaker uncle and Nena's husband. He used to appear frequently in the first issues of the Maggy comics in the 90s, but rarely appears in current comics.

Carmem da Esquina 
Carmem da Esquina (lit. Carmem from the Corner) - A fat and grumpy middle-aged lady that lives in the Lemon Street. She is known to hate every child from the neighborhood because always have her flower garden destroyed by them. She is single and is always looking for a boyfriend already having dated Seu Jura and also Sunny's father. She does not have a regular design often appearing in most stories with a different look but is easily recognized for wearing a purple dress and having a brown hair in a hideous haircut.

Animals

Blu 
Blu (Bidu) is Franklin's pet dog. He was originally the first main character of the franchise, along with his owner Franklin. In the Monica's Gang stories he usually appears as a normal dog who does not speak. However, he is usually seen talking and acting like a human being in their own stories, where he works as a cartoon actor, along with Glu and Manfred. He has the ability to talk to inanimate objects like a stone.

Fluffy 
Fluffy (Floquinho, lit. Little Flake) is Jimmy Five's pet dog, a green and extremely hairy dog of unknown race. Appears since the first newspaper strips. His weird look and hairy body usually are used as joke in most of the stories in which he appears, usually about its head being identical to its tail, if Fluffy is really a dog or even the fact that Fluffy can hide objects and people inside its fur. In 1995 Fluffy was considered a Lhasa Apso after Mauricio de Sousa received a letter from a reader comparing Fluffy with this breed, however in 2016 Fluffy's breed was changed to Puli. In the live-action film Turma da Mônica: Laços Fluffy's breed is a Lhasa Apso.

Vanilla 
Vanilla (Mingau, lit. Porridge) is Maggy's pet cat. He was introduced in the very first Maggy comic book, at first being presented as a nameless stray cat adopted by Maggy, but in 1989 had a contest to choose its name.

Chauvy 
Chauvy (Chovinista) is Smudge's pet pig. He's a clean, friendly and polite pig, is often treated as a dog by its owner and sometimes shows human traits to appear to watch television and take a bath sometimes, although unlike Blu and Vanilla he does not speak in his own stories. Originally he debuted timidly in the comics without personality or name and being portrayed dirty and hydrophobic like its owner, but over time his personality was changing, especially after the appearance of Smudge's own comic book in the 80s, although sometimes there are still some recent stories in which he appears dirty.

Ditto 
Ditto (Monicão) is Monica's pet dog, as his owner it has big teeth and same hair, is a very energetic dog, that likes to bite (and sometimes destroy) everything he sees in front; he's Monica's second dog (first was napoleon(napoleão).

Radar 
Radar is Doreen's guide dog, Radar is a Labrador. She obtained him in a small tournament after unsuccessfully trying to buy him in a pet store of Jequitibás, the city in which she lived before she moved to Bairro do Limoreiro.

Rufus 
Rufus (Rúfius) is an aggressive and furious dog that often scares the neighborhood children. He is known by the title "The angriest dog of the street". His owner is unknown, although it is believed that he belongs to Tony.

Other animals 
Duke (Duque) - Blu's best friend. He is another dog.
 The Six Cats - As it is known Vanilla's family, they are a total of five siblings (Vanilla is the sixth cat) each with his own characteristic. Matias is the adventurous cat who lives in a pier, Tita is a hillbilly female cat who lives on a farm, Nestor is a stray cat, Lili is a rich female cat who lives in a mansion, and Percival is a black cat belonging to a witch. Their owners are also unknown.
 Aveia - Toddy's pet cat that is also Vanilla's girlfriend.
 Leleala - They are a strange squad of three troublemakers angels pigs. Usually appears to try to protect the animals, especially pigs, but they live to cause chaos and problems where fly.
 Napoleão - He was the first Monica's pet dog, before Ditto. He appeared in only one story.
 The Flies - In some stories some flies are seen flying over Smudge, attracted by his stench. Smudge considers flies as his friends sometimes giving names to them. These flies are often a recurring joke in stories.

Villains

Captain Fray 
Captain Fray (Capitão Feio, lit. "Captain Ugly") – The villain appears that most of the enemy Monica and Smudge. He is a polluter lord with powers to control the garbage and dirt, with the ambition to make the world his garbage disposal.
 Sewer creatures - Captain Fray's minions. They are beings of trash, and usually are stupid and incompetent.

Lorde Coelhão 
Lorde Coelhão (lit. Lord Big Rabbit) is one of the gang's most famous -and harmless- enemies. He is a satire of Darth Vader, hailing from the planet Cenourando (a joke with the Portuguese word for carrot, "cenoura"). He commands a great army of "coelhoides" (a portmanteau from the Portuguese words "Coelho" (rabbit) and "Androide" (Android)). His main assistant is "Zoiudo" (a Brazilian slang for "big-eyed"), a flying being who does nothing but repeat the orders given by his master and spy on the gang. He first appeared in the movie As Aventuras da Turma da Mônica, but had a bigger role in the sequel A Princesa e o Robô being the main villain who aims to dominate the planet Cenourano and marry Princess Mimi. In the comics he had rare appearances.

Dr. Spam 
Professor Spada/Doctor Spam (Professor Spada (an Italian-descent surname meaning sword)/Doutor Spam) – The most recent enemy of Monica's gang, introduced in 2005, he is the only character with two personalities. When he is Professor Spada, he is a gentle, happy computer technician. But if eventually hit by a short circuit (most often caused by an accidental bashing from Monica's bunny), he becomes the evil Doctor Spam, who can travel through the internet, which means he can be in any part of the globe in within some seconds to disseminate computer viruses. He is based on Maurício's son Maurício Spada e Sousa, while his double personality disturb was inspired by Robert Louis Stevenson's Strange Case of Dr. Jekyll and Mr. Hyde. His good alter ego is called Professor Spada because Mauricio likes to teach. Maurício Spada e Sousa died on 2 May 2016 of heart attack.

Dr. McClean 
Dr. McClean (Dr. Olimpo) - One of the main villains of Smudge, almost a paradox of Captain Fray. He is a mad scientist neurotic about cleanliness that only cares about wanting to transform the world into his lair cleaning. His main target Smudge for not supporting their dirt, and is also the archenemy Captain Fray, despite both being villains who want to defeat the Smudge. Is always aided by his henchman Sapóleo, although in more recent stories also have the help of twin sisters Cremilda and Clotilde.
 Sapóleo - Dr. Olimpo's henchman. A stupid short man sometimes ruins the plans of his boss.

Cremilda and Clotilde 
Cremilda and Clotilde - Are a pair of fat twin sisters, who like Dr. McClean are neurotic about cleanliness. Often appear creating plans to bathe Smudge, but their plans always fail and the boy manages to escape unharmed of the water. They are not necessarily evil (although they are in frequent contact with other villains), and also Smudge never showed any negative feelings for them always seeing them as friends. They have twin nieces called Lara and Luiza.

Viviane 
Viviane - A young and beautiful witch who lives in the Lemon Street. She has her powers derived from the moon and often creates plans that involve summoning the moon power to rule the world. She is the enemy of the neighborhood kids, especially Maggy who ironically is responsible for ruining their plans to conquer the moon. Is always accompanied by her black cat pet Bóris. In Monica Teen she has a daughter named Ramona.
 Bóris - Viviane's talking pet black cat.

The Tombanians 
They are a clumsy and mysterious alien race from a planet known as Tomba. They are characterized by always wearing a spacesuit hiding their real faces and are able to transform to take on the appearance of other people. At first they were introduced in a story focused on Smudge where he at first mistakes them for his friends believing they were playing aliens, until later discovering that they were actually real alien invaders. At the end of the same story it is revealed that the Tombanians took the form of Smudge and accidentally left one of their allies (who with amnesia came to believe to be the real Smudge) while taking the real Smudge. After this story they had a few other appearances, including meeting with Bubbly in the space (while in their Smudge form) and later in Monica Teen where they are shown bigger and older.

Capitão Picolé 
Capitão Picolé (literally: Captain Popsicle) - A recurring villain who appeared in a miniseries that parodied the American series Lost. He was the first character created by Mauricio de Sousa, during his childhood, however, he was forgotten and rebelled against the other characters capturing them and imprisoning on an island (including characters who have been forgotten in the first strips, like Nico Demon and Zé Munheca). He was defeated by Monica but escaped. he is !SPOILER ALERT! The real person behind Cabeça de balde(lit: bucket head), whose shown as anyone of the gang till Monica N°54-600 edições, grandes emoções(600 editions, great emotions)(panini-2019) when they figured out who and why cabeça de balde wanted to defeat the gang.

Cabeleira Negra 
Cabeleira Negra - A young and beautiful female space pirate who was one of the villains in the film Uma Aventura no Tempo. She is captain of a squad of space pirates known for various crimes in space, besides being a descendant of Blackbeard. In the film was the Bubbly's rival and also love interest. It is revealed in the film she is also bald and wears a wig. Her last appearance was in one of the first editions of Monica Teen.

Penha, Agnes and Sofia 
A trio of mean girls who are known for living in the neighboring neighborhood, the Bairro das Pitangueiras, and are often referred as the Pitangueiras' Girls. They are portrayed as enemies of the children of Limoeiro, mainly Monica, Maggy and Denise who are considered their biggest rivals.

Penha is the leader, being a rich and spoiled girl, with attitudes very similar to Cindy's, notably already dating Jimmy Five once causing Monica to be jealous. It is revealed over the course of the issues that her father is a corrupt politician and her mother is a vampire who hides in the depths of her mansion. Her design is very similar to Little Lulu.

Agnes is a paranoid, cold and unsympathetic girl who has no friends (except for Penha and Sofia) and has a habit of kidnapping animals (such as birds) to keep them in cages. She lives in an old mansion together with the ghosts of her deceased parents, who influenced her daughter's antisocial behavior. In Monica Teen it is revealed that she died and became a ghost.

Sofia is a huge and grumpy obese girl with immense strength (very similar to Little Lotta), being even resistant enough to Monica's coelhadas. Because of her large size, her extraordinary strength and being always grumpy, she is usually feared by the other characters (except her friends Penha and Agnes). In Monica Teen she returns, but redeeming herself by claiming that she was misunderstood in childhood and never wanted to be the enemy in the first place.

Soninha 
Soninha - Denise's evil imaginary sister. Originally debuted as a recurring character in a 90s story in a time when Denise still had an inconsistent personality and design. Later after many years absent and forgotten the character returned to appear in a story as a villain conspiring to overthrow Denise, revealing her past as an imaginary sister that Denise created and who became real after a birthday wish. She has the ability to manipulate people by usually convincing them to be her friends through compliments, countering Denise's arrogant and rude personality, and also create illusions.

Recurring characters 
 Garotão (literally Big Boy) - An unseen giant child, that is one of the old Jimmy Five's friends. He has a very formidable height for his age. Due to his size he is often seen with giant toys and doing absurd things like crossing the Mediterranean Sea or causing earthquakes by jumping. Because of the size he never physically appeared in the comics, often making the characters believe he was an imaginary friend of Jimmy Five. He appeared only in the first few strips, but also made some recent special guest appearances in comic books, usually having his feet visibly appearing.
 Bernardão (literally Big Bernard) (Appeared only in the first few strips) - A sad boy, a friend of Jimmy Five. Always dressed in black clothes and a down look he is known for often makes bad luck for people who approach of him, mostly Jimmy Five, though he always gets away from bad luck. By always jinxing his friends, he is a very lonely boy.
 Leonardo (Appeared only in the first few strips) - An artistic boy, named after Leonardo da Vinci. Like Marina he has an incredible talent with paintings and sculptures. He is a friend of Jimmy Five and has a passion for Maggy.
 Massaro - A Japanese immigrant boy who first appeared in a 1972 comic book as a new friend of Jimmy Five. He is a boy who is very faithful to Japanese traditions to the point of wearing a kimono and getas all the time. He also cannot speak Portuguese properly, having a strong Japanese accent. The character has rare appearances, even being forgotten until 2008, when he reintroduced himself as Tikara's cousin.
 Estrelinha Mágica (literally Magic Little Star) - A magical star who became friends with Monica after losing its forces and falling in her room at night of Christmas. She was the protagonist of the 1988's movie "Monica's Gang The Magic Star". With the success of the film in the year the character appeared in some comics and sold a toy manufactured by Tectoy. The character however has been forgotten over time.
 Robozinho (literally Little Robot) - A coelhoide with emotions, he was the main character in the 1983 animated film A Princesa e o Robô. He had a strong love for Princess Mimi and became rival with Lord Big Rabbit, fighting for the Mimi's love. At the end of the movie he becomes a real rabbit.
 Princess Mimi - The princess from the Cenourano planet. A pink anthropomorphic alien rabbit and the love interest of Robozinho and Lord Big Rabbit. She appeared as a teenager in one of the sagas in Monica Teen.
 Mimi's Father - Is the king of the Cenourano planet. A chubby and old anthropomorphic alien rabbit. He reappears in one of Monica Teen's sagas, with a very different look.
 Monica's Love Interests - In several comics Monica (and sometimes the other girls in the neighborhood) is seen falling in love with other boys, most notably having their names ending in "inho" (Portuguese suffix for diminutive male names). One of the most notable is Reinaldinho, inspired by former MSP writer Reinaldo Waisman, who used to appear frequently in the 80s and 90s. In current comics, Monica's main interest is Fabio (Fabinho Boa Pinta). The other boys, particularly Jimmy Five, tend to dislike or envy these boys. Sometimes Jimmy Five takes advantage of Monica's strong love interest in these boys to create plans against her.
 Capitão Pitoco - A fictional parody superhero, very similar to Superman and Batman (although his design is similar to Space Ghost). He is the favorite superhero of all the boys from the neighborhood, mainly Jimmy and Smudge. The character debuted in the 2000s, since previously the heroes that were used in the comics were usually Marvel and DC Comics superheroes.
 Superomão - A parody of Superman. Often appears as either a fictional character (being Jimmy Five's favorite superhero) or a character that exists and interacts with the children of Limoeiro. A frequent running gag is that the character, as much powerful as he is, is unable to overcome Monica's strength, which is even capable of defeating him. His appearance varies, sometimes being drawn exactly identical to Superman. The real Superman officially appeared in a crossover between the Justice League and Monica's Gang in 2018.
 Ursinho Bilu - A fictional teddy bear and cartoon character in the comics. He is a cute bear very popular among the neighborhood kids. The character is a parody of bear characters like Winnie-the-Pooh and Care Bears.
 António Alfacinha - Manezinho's younger brother and friend of Jimmy Five. A Portuguese immigrant who often speaks with a Portuguese accent. He also is good friends with Monica having a crush on her. He made his comic book debut in 2007, but has had rare appearances since his debut. Sometimes he's just called Alfacinha (a term to denote a person from Lisbon) that means "little lettuce", because of this nickname Manezinho considers him a great friend for Jimmy Five, because according to him "vegetables get along well" (basing that Jimmy Five's original name is also a vegetable name).
 André - A 4-year-old autistic boy who is friends with Monica and Jimmy Five.
 Tati - An optimistic girl with down syndrome who is classmate of Monica and her friends.
 Igor and Vitória - They are a couple of seropositive children, classmates Monica and her friends.
 Vanda and Valéria - based on Mauricio's twin daughters, the first is described by herself as an "authentic and strong" person, while the latter, also according to herself, likes to cook.
 Tikara Sasaki (Brazilian way of saying "Chikara" (力), Japanese word that means power, strength) - This Japanese Brazilian character was created by Mauricio to be the mascot of the "Comemoração do Centenário da Imigração Japonesa no Brasil" (Celebration of the Centenary of the Japanese immigration to Brazil). He appeared in Monica's strips in May and June 2008. Since 2008 he has never returned in comics, although he is a regular character in Monica Teen.
 Keika Takeda - The female Japanese-Brazilian character in the comics. She entered in the comics with her friend Tikara, in May 2008's Monica comic as the commemorative mascot for the 100 year anniversary of Japanese immigration to Brazil. Like Tikara she has also never returned to comics since 2008, although she is also a regular character in Monica Teen. Her name is a reference to Alice Keiko Takeda, Mauricio de Sousa's wife.
 Binho - Milena's younger brother. He is one of Junior's friends.
 Sol - Milena's older sister. She is Crystal's best friend.

References 

Monica's Gang
Lists of comics characters